Baillargues is a commune in the Hérault department in the Occitanie region in southern France. Baillargues station has rail connections to Narbonne, Montpellier and Avignon.

Population

See also
Communes of the Hérault department

References

Communes of Hérault